Gocha Gochayevich Gogrichiani (born 5 May 2000) is a Russian football player of Georgian descent who plays for FC Baltika Kaliningrad.

Club career
He made his debut in the Russian Football National League for FC Akron Tolyatti on 27 February 2021 in a game against FC Veles Moscow. He came on a substitute in 85th minute and scored an equalizer in a 1–1 away draw 3 minutes later.

On 17 June 2021, he moved to FC Tekstilshchik Ivanovo on loan for the 2021–22 season.

On 4 July 2022, Gogrichiani signed a three-year contract with FC Baltika Kaliningrad.

Personal life
His father, also called Gocha Gogrichiani, was a Georgian international footballer.

In October 2022, FC Baltika Kaliningrad was suspended from training due to an internal investigation of the club related to the accusation of beating a girlfriend.

References

External links
 
 Profile by Russian Football National League

2000 births
Sportspeople from Sochi
Russian sportspeople of Georgian descent
Living people
Russian footballers
Association football forwards
FC Rostov players
PFC CSKA Moscow players
FC Akron Tolyatti players
FC Tekstilshchik Ivanovo players
FC Baltika Kaliningrad players
Russian First League players
Russian Second League players